Rajapalayam is an assembly constituency located in Virudhunagar district in Tamil Nadu. It falls under Tenkasi Lok Sabha Constituency. It is one of the 234 State Legislative Assembly Constituencies in Tamil Nadu, in India.

Madras State assembly

Tamil Nadu assembly

Rajapalayam Assembly constituency moved to Tenkasi Lok Sabha constituency after 2009.

Election Results

2021

2016

2011

2006

2001

1996

1991

1989

1984

1980

1977

1971

1967

1962

References 

 

Assembly constituencies of Tamil Nadu
Virudhunagar district